Animo Locke Technology High School is a public high school in Los Angeles, California, USA. The school opened on September 4, 2007, and is part of the Green Dot Public Schools.

Issues
In May 2008, Animo Locke was one of several schools cancelling field trips because of the cost of transportation.

References

High schools in Los Angeles
Educational institutions established in 2007
Public high schools in California
Harbor Gateway, Los Angeles
2007 establishments in California